The Naismith Memorial Basketball Hall of Fame, located in Springfield, Massachusetts, honors players who have shown exceptional skill at basketball, all-time great coaches, referees, and other major contributors to the sport. It is named after Dr. James Naismith, who conceived the sport in 1891; he was inducted into the Hall as a contributor in 1959. The Player category has existed since the beginning of the Hall of Fame. For a person to be eligible on the ballot for Hall of Fame honors as a player, he or she must be fully retired for three years. If a player retired for a short period, then "his/her case and eligibility is reviewed on an individual basis".

As part of the inaugural class of 1959, four players were inducted; over 150 more individuals have been inducted as players since then. Five players have also been inducted as coaches: John Wooden in 1973, Lenny Wilkens in 1998, Bill Sharman in 2004, Tom Heinsohn in 2015, and Bill Russell in 2021.

Of the inducted players, 30 were also members of teams that have been inducted into the Hall as units.
 Zack Clayton, Tarzan Cooper, William "Pop" Gates, and John Isaacs were members of the New York Renaissance. The induction category of another former player for the team, Nathaniel "Sweetwater" Clifton, is subject to dispute; he was originally announced as a contributor, but is now listed with player inductees by the Hall. 
 Marques Haynes and Reece "Goose" Tatum were two of the most famous players of the Harlem Globetrotters. Five other players who made their greatest contributions with other teams—Sonny Boswell, Wilt Chamberlain, Connie Hawkins, Inman "Big Jack" Jackson, Albert "Runt" Pullins, and Lynette Woodard—were members of the Globetrotters at some point in their professional careers. Furthermore, longtime member Meadowlark Lemon has been inducted as a contributor, and the aforementioned Clifton, who briefly played for the team, is (depending on definitions) a member as either a player or contributor.
 Walt Bellamy, Jerry Lucas, Oscar Robertson, and Jerry West were members of the 1960 United States Olympic Team.
 Charles Barkley, Larry Bird, Clyde Drexler, Patrick Ewing, Magic Johnson, Michael Jordan, Karl Malone, Chris Mullin, Scottie Pippen, David Robinson, and John Stockton were members of the 1992 United States Olympic Team, better known as the "Dream Team". In fact, all but one of the players on the "Dream Team" roster (Christian Laettner) have been inducted in the Hall of Fame as individuals.

Players

References
General – Naismith Memorial Hall of Fame members

General – Other groups of players
50 Greatest Players in NBA History – 
50 Greatest Euroleague Contributors – 
FIBA Hall of Fame members
Living when inducted –  (first page of 3; links to other pages at bottom of list)
Posthumous inductees –  (first page of 2; link to other page at bottom of list)
Women's Basketball Hall of Fame members – 

Specific

 
Hall of Fame